The St. Peter and St. Paul's Serbian Orthodox Church ( / ), also known as the Serbian Church, is an edifice located in the city of Arad, Romania. It was built between 1698 and 1702 and it is located in the Serbian square.

One of the oldest buildings in Arad, it was erected by the Serbian community of the city. It was an important presence because of the arrival of Habsburg armies in the area. After the treaty of Karlowitz the entirety of Transylvania became an Austrian province. Because the border with the Ottoman Empire was set on the Mureș River, in the area of Arad were posted guards, especially Serbians. As a consequence a church was built in the biggest city of the area, Arad. Artist Stefan Tenecki painted the icons of the iconostasis in the second half of the 18th century. 

The building was financed by Captain Iovan.

18th-century Serbian Orthodox church buildings
Buildings and structures in Arad, Romania
Historic monuments in Arad County
Churches completed in 1702
Serbian Orthodox church buildings in Romania
Tourist attractions in Arad County
1702 establishments in Europe

ro:Biserica Sârbească din Arad